Dolphin Drilling Holdings Limited is an offshore drilling rig company headquartered in Aberdeen, Scotland, United Kingdom with its main subsidiary Dolphin Drilling AS located in Sandnes, Norway. Until 2019, Dolphin Drilling had its headquarters in Oslo, Norway.

The company offers services for the offshore industry within offshore drilling.

History
In 1965, A/S Aker Drilling Company Ltd. (Dolphin Drilling) was established. In 1976, Fred. Olsen & Co. acquired Aker Drilling Services, and renamed it Dolphin Services A/S.

In 1997, based on Dolphin Services A/S, the Fred. Olsen Energy ASA was formed. The company was listed on Oslo Stock Exchange with the tickers FOE and later DDASA. In 1998, its remotely operated vehicle division was sold to Stolt Comex Seaways (now Subsea 7). In 2003, Dolphin Well Services AS was sold to PSL Energy Services Limited.

Fred. Olsen Energy ASA was renamed to Dolphin Drilling ASA in December 2018. In June 2019, Dolphin Drilling filed for bankruptcy. The main shareholders that time were the companies Bonheur and Ganger Rolf ASA, controlled by the Olsen family.  A debt investor SVP Global acquired more than 90% of the company's debts and transferred its operating subsidiaries to a new Jersey-registered holding company, Dolphin Drilling Holdings Limited. Shortly afterwards, the international headquarters of the company were moved to Aberdeen.

In May 2022, it was announced that Cyprus-headquartered oilfield services company, SD Standard ETC had acquired a 25% stake in Dolphin Drilling, as part of a $10 million USD deal.

Fleet
Fleet owned and operated:

1 deepwater drilling rig Blackford Dolphin - 7 000 ft water depth 
2 Mid water semi submersible drilling rigs, Borgland Dolphin and Bideford Dolphin

References

External links

Drilling rig operators
Service companies of Norway
Service companies of Scotland
Companies based in Aberdeen
Business services companies established in 1965
Petroleum industry in Norway
Oil and gas industry in Scotland
Fred. Olsen & Co.
Companies formerly listed on the Oslo Stock Exchange
1965 establishments in Scotland
1976 mergers and acquisitions